Damien Albert René Perquis (born 10 April 1984) is a former professional footballer and current assistant coach of Gazélec Ajaccio's B-team.

A defender, he represented France at youth level, before acquiring Polish citizenship and playing for Poland at senior level.  He retired in June 2020, after an 18-year professional career.

Personal life 
Perquis was born in Troyes, France. He is of Polish descent by way of his grandmother, Józefa Bierła. His Polish ancestors were from Strzyżewko, in central Poland. He is married, and has two children.

Club career

Troyes 
Perquis came up through the Troyes AC youth system. He played in Ligue 2 with Troyes AC for 2 years, where he was rated as one of the best defenders of the league.

Saint-Étienne 
In 2005, he signed for Ligue 1 club AS Saint-Étienne as a free agent. In two seasons, he failed to impress with the club and was loaned to Sochaux. After some initial troubles, he finally found his form and became a regular in the starting line-up.

Sochaux 
In 2008, Sochaux bought the player outright. He made a total of 146 appearances for the club, scoring eleven goals, before leaving the club in the summer of 2012.

Real Betis 
In the summer of 2012, Perquis joined Real Betis in Spain. He suffered through various injury problems while in Spain, and was limited to 32 league matches in his three years with Betis.

Toronto FC 
Perquis was released by Betis and signed with Toronto FC of Major League Soccer on 26 January 2015. He mutually agreed to part ways with the club on 12 July 2016.

Nottingham Forest 
On 22 July 2016, Perquis signed a two-year deal with Nottingham Forest. On 27 August 2016, he scored his first goal for the club in a 3–1 home win against Leeds United. On 24 July 2017, Perquis and Nottingham Forest agreed to mutually terminate his contract at the club.

Gazélec Ajaccio 
In 2017, he moved to Gazélec Ajaccio in the French third tier, where he played for two years.

International career 
In December 2008, he declared his interest in playing for the Polish national team. Franciszek Smuda, manager of Poland, confirmed that information in July 2010. In January 2011, it was reported that Perquis had filed his citizenship application papers. However, his family had lost some required documents, and Smuda had to request that the Polish president Bronislaw Komorowski approve his application. Perquis received Polish citizenship on 1 September 2011.

On 6 September 2011, Perquis made his international debut during a 2–2 friendly draw against Germany in Gdańsk. He scored his first goal on 26 May 2012, in a 1–0 friendly win against Slovakia. He was selected to the final squad for the UEFA Euro 2012.

Coaching career
After announcing his retirement from football on social medias on 15 June 2020, Perquis was appointed assistant coach of Gazélec Ajaccio's reserve team.

Career statistics

Club

International

International goals 
Scores and results list Poland's goal tally first.

References

External links 
 
 
 France U-21 season 2005–06 

1984 births
Living people
Polish footballers
Poland international footballers
UEFA Euro 2012 players
French footballers
Sportspeople from Troyes
Association football defenders
Footballers from Grand Est
French people of Polish descent
Polish people of French descent
Citizens of Poland through descent
France under-21 international footballers
INF Clairefontaine players
ES Troyes AC players
AS Saint-Étienne players
FC Sochaux-Montbéliard players
Real Betis players
Toronto FC players
Nottingham Forest F.C. players
Ligue 1 players
Ligue 2 players
La Liga players
Segunda División players
Major League Soccer players
English Football League players
Expatriate footballers in Spain
Expatriate soccer players in Canada
Expatriate footballers in England
Polish expatriate footballers
Polish expatriate sportspeople in Spain
Polish expatriate sportspeople in Canada
Polish expatriate sportspeople in England
French expatriate footballers
French expatriate sportspeople in Spain
French expatriate sportspeople in Canada
French expatriate sportspeople in England
Association football coaches